Matthew Edward Milnes (born 29 July 1994) is an English professional cricketer who currently plays for Kent County Cricket Club, having moved from Nottinghamshire at the end of the 2018 season. Milnes was born in Nottingham and grew up in the city and attended West Bridgford School in the city before going to Durham University. A seam bowler, he was part of the Nottinghamshire Academy programme before making his first-class cricket debut in April 2014 for Durham MCC University against Derbyshire. He received a Half-Palatinate for his cricketing activities at university.

Whilst at university Milnes played for Durham Second XI in 2013 and 2014 and for Nottinghamshire's Second XI from 2016. After graduating from university he initially signed a three-month contract with Nottinghamshire in June 2017 after impressing the club with his performances for the Second XI. At the end of the season he attracted interest from Durham before signing a one-year deal with Nottinghamshire. He made his Nottinghamshire debut in June 2018 before going on to play six times for the county during the season, taking 11 wickets.

In September 2018 he signed a three-year contract with Kent for the start of the 2019 season despite being offered a contract extension by Nottinghamshire, making his Kent debut in the county's first match of the 2019 season against Loughborough MCCU. He made his List A cricket debut on 17 April 2019, taking a five-wicket haul on debut for Kent against Hampshire in the 2019 Royal London One-Day Cup.

After having been signed as a replacement for Welsh Fire during the 2021 season of The Hundred, in April 2022 he was drafted by Oval Invincibles for the 2022 season.

References

External links
 

1994 births
Living people
English cricketers
Durham MCCU cricketers
Nottinghamshire cricketers
Kent cricketers
Cricketers from Nottingham
Alumni of Stephenson College, Durham
Welsh Fire cricketers
Oval Invincibles cricketers